Nemours is a commune in the Seine-et-Marne department in the Île-de-France region in north-central France.

Geography
Nemours is located on the Loing and its canal, c.  south of Melun, on the Moret–Lyon railway. Nemours – Saint-Pierre station has rail connections to Montargis, Melun, Nevers and Paris.

History
Nemours is supposed to derive its name from the woods (nemora) in the midst of which it formerly stood, and discoveries of Gallo-Roman remains indicate its early origin. It was captured by the English in 1420, but derives its historical importance rather from the lordship, afterwards Duchy of Nemours, and the fief lords the Duke of Nemours to which it gave its name. In 1585 a treaty revoking previous concessions to the Protestants was concluded at Nemours between Catherine de' Medici and the Guises.

Demographics
Inhabitants are called Nemouriens.

Sights
The church, which dates mainly from the sixteenth century, has a handsome wooden spire. The feudal castle, erected around 1120 was turned into a museum in the 20th century. It has a central keep with four rounded towers.

A statue of the mathematician Bézout (d. 1783), a native of the town, was erected in 1885.

In the vicinity is a group of fine sandstone rocks, and sand is extensively quarried.

Hospital
Nemours has a campus of the Centre hospitalier Sud Seine et Marne.

Notable people
Nemours was the birthplace of:
 Pierre Berthier (1782-1861), geologist and mining engineer
 Étienne Bézout (1730–1783), mathematician
 Geoffrey Kondogbia (born 1993), professional footballer
 Justin-Chrysostome Sanson (1833–1910), sculptor
 Philippe Petit (1949-), highwire artist

Twin towns – sister cities

Nemours is twinned with:
 Mühltal, Germany
 Wilmington, United States

See also
 Pierre Samuel du Pont de Nemours
 Duke of Nemours
 Communes of the Seine-et-Marne department

References

External links

Official site 
Nemours tourism office website
1999 Land Use, from IAURIF (Institute for Urban Planning and Development of the Paris-Île-de-France région) 

Communes of Seine-et-Marne